Raw is an adjective usually describing:
 Raw materials, basic materials from which products are manufactured or made
 Raw food, uncooked food

Raw or RAW may also refer to:

Computing and electronics
 .RAW, a proprietary mass spectrometry data format
 Raw audio format, a file type used to represent sound in uncompressed form
 Raw image format, a variety of image files used by digital cameras, containing unprocessed data
 Rawdisk, binary level disk access
 Read after write, technologies used for CD-R and CD-RW 
 Read after write (RAW) hazard, a data dependency hazard considered in microprocessor architecture
 Raw display, a raw framed monitor.

Film and television
 Raw TV, a British TV production company
 Raw (film), a 2016 film
 Raw (TV series), an Irish drama series
 Eddie Murphy Raw, a 1987 live stand-up comedy recording
 Ramones: Raw, a 2004 music documentary
 Raw FM, an Australian television series
 WWE Raw, a weekly World Wrestling Entertainment program

Games
 Rules as written, or RAW, the literal rules of a game, similar to the letter of the law
 WWF Raw (1994 video game), professional wrestling video game
 RAW 2, Xbox professional wrestling video game
 WWE video games, category listing all games based on WWE RAW franchise and more

Magazines
 Raw (magazine), comics magazine launched in 1980
 Raw (music magazine), British magazine published by EMAP in the 1980s and 1990s
 Raw Magazine, published by World Wrestling Entertainment, see WWE Magazine

Music

Albums
 R.A.W. (album), a 2000 album by Daz Dillinger
 Raw (Jimmy Barnes album), 2001
 Raw (Crack the Sky album), 1986
 Raw (Hopsin album), 2010
 Raw (Juvenile album), 2005
 Raw (Keith LeBlanc album), 1990
 Raw (Moxy album), 2002
 Raw (Ra album), 2006
 Raw (Sex Pistols album), recorded 1976, released 1997
 Raw (Shannon Noll album), 2021
 Raw (The Alarm album), 1991
 Raw (Alyson Williams album), 1989
 A Little More Personal (Raw), a 2005 album by Lindsay Lohan

Songs
 "Raw", a song by Bad Meets Evil from the Southpaw soundtrack
 "Raw", the lead single from Spandau Ballet's Heart Like a Sky
 "Raw", a song by Staind from Dysfunction

People
 Mr Raw, (born 1975), stage name of rapper Okechukwu Edwards Ukeje
 Robert Anton Wilson (1932–2007), an American author.
 The Mighty Raw, pseudonym of American musician Ron Wasserman
 David Raw (born 1944), English cricketer
 Harry Raw (born 1903), English footballer
 Nathan Raw (1866–1940), English physician and politician
 Peter Raw (1922–1988), Royal Australian Air Force officer
 Rowland Raw (1884–1915), English cricketer
 Simon Raw (born 1994), South African rugby union player
 Steve Raw (born 1966), English darts player
 Sydney Raw (1898–1967), Royal Navy vice admiral
 Vanessa Raw (born 1984), English triathlete
 Vause Raw (1921–2001), South African politician

Other uses 
 Raw, Northumberland, a former civil parish, now in Brinkburn, England
 Raw, North Yorkshire, England
 Raw (novel), 1998 novel by Scott Monk
 RAW (rolling papers), hemp based rolling papers introduced in 2005
 Raw (WWE brand), one of the WWE brands
 Radio Warwick, call letters RAW, the University of Warwick student radio station
 Raw Comedy Award, an Australian competition for stand-up comedians
 Research and Analysis Wing, or RAW, India's external intelligence agency
 Rifleman's Assault Weapon, a rocket-propelled rifle-launched standoff munition
 Rosa Antifa Wien

See also 
 Raww, an American music group
 Rawe (disambiguation)
 Rau (disambiguation)